Rose Hart (born January 9, 1942) is a retired female track and field athlete from Ghana. She specialised in the hurdling, the sprints and the discus throw events during her career.

Hart represented Ghana at the 1964 Olympic Games. She twice claimed a gold medal for her native West African country at the All-Africa Games: 1965 and 1973.

External links
 sports-reference

1942 births
Living people
Ghanaian female hurdlers
Ghanaian discus throwers
Ghanaian female sprinters
Olympic athletes of Ghana
Athletes (track and field) at the 1964 Summer Olympics
Female discus throwers
Commonwealth Games competitors for Ghana
Athletes (track and field) at the 1962 British Empire and Commonwealth Games
Athletes (track and field) at the 1966 British Empire and Commonwealth Games
Athletes (track and field) at the 1974 British Commonwealth Games
African Games gold medalists for Ghana
African Games medalists in athletics (track and field)
Athletes (track and field) at the 1965 All-Africa Games